Alderney is a suburb of the town of Poole in Dorset, England with a population of 11,196, increasing to 11,423 at the 2011 Census. Alderney is south of Wallisdown and west of Alder Hills.

Alderney is part of the Alderney and Bourne Valley ward for council elections.

Geography
The boundaries of Alderney are roughly defined as being all areas north of Herbert Avenue, west of Alder Road (between the junction at Herbert Avenue and the Wallisdown roundabout), south of Wallisdown Road (between Wallisdown and Mountbatten roundabouts) and streets branching off both sides of Ringwood Road (between Mountbatten roundabout and the junction with Herbert Avenue) 

This definition is for the ward of Alderney as defined by the borough of Poole in its ward profiling, although some areas are more commonly referred to as other suburbs e.g. the area southwest of Walisdown roundabout is often referred to as Wallisdown (historically Highmore) and the area around the junction of Herbert Avenue and Alder Road is known as Rossmore.

History
Up until the 1940s, most of the area between Herbert Avenue and Ringwood Road was heathland known as Alderney Heath. After the Second World War there was a great need for housing due to a sharp increase in population. Poole Council built many council owned houses in Alderney in the late forties and fifties, mostly semi-detached houses and terraces of four. Later, more housing was added, generally bungalows.

Bourne Valley
Situated in the middle of Alderney, Bourne Valley is made up of a few different areas of land all joined together to make one large area.

Bourne Valley nature reserve
Bourne Valley nature reserve is a Site of Special Scientific Interest (SSSI). Situated to the north of Alderney, the area includes the protected lowland heath, Bourne Bottom. The area has many paths which connect to various streets. The main path starts at Ringwood Road which links to a tunnel under the busy dual carriageway, which provides access to the West part of Alderney and Canford Heath. The path lies parallel to the stream and joins Bloxworth Road at the other side.

As the name suggests, Bourne Valley is the start of one of the tributaries forming the Bourne Stream which eventually runs into Bournemouth. Three culverts which emerge from under Ringwood Road start the stream, and it is believed they come from Canford Heath, Sembcorp water works, and road run-off.

Bourne Valley Park
To the south of Evering Avenue is Bourne Valley Park, formerly known as Alderney Recreation ground. The whole area was developed between 2003 and 2007 by the Bourne Stream partnership after the area became a problem: football pitches that were too boggy to be used, antisocial behavior from motorcycle riders, pollution from nearby commercial ventures and rubbish.

The  open space now consists of wooded areas, heathland, streams, a pond, much open grass land, a large adventure park and off-road bike park.

Buildings and landmarks

Alderney Hospital

Alderney Hospital was built in 1888 for the care of the elderly; it now specialises in dementia and mental health with both in and out patients.

Alderney Manor Community Centre
Alderney Manor Community Centre is a social venue which holds classes and events and can be hired out by organisations and members of the public. Whilst the entrance is on Berkeley Avenue, the address is on Herbert Avenue. There is a main hall with access to toilets, a kitchen, lounge/bar area, small upstairs meeting room and carpark; the downstairs is wheelchair accessible. The venue is used as a polling station for local and general elections.

Schools
 St Aldhelm's Academy (formerly Rossmore Community College and Martin Kemp-Welch School)
 Manorside Primary School
 Winchelsea Special School

Ward Profiling
It is Poole's second most densely populated area with 31 people to each hectare (2.5 acres) and suffers much higher than average levels of poverty, illiteracy and crime. However, this does not reflect every part of the ward.

Politics 
Alderney is part of the Alderney and Bourne Valley ward on Bournemouth, Christchurch and Poole Council. Alderney is also part of the Bournemouth West parliamentary constituency.

Street names
Streets near Alderney Avenue have been named after various places in the Channel Islands, including:

 Alderney Avenue            - Alderney is one of the Channel Islands and part of the Bailiwick of Guernsey
 Jersey Road, Jersey Close  - Jersey is one of the Channel Islands
 Guernsey Road              - Guernsey is one of the Channel Islands
 Herm Road                  - Herm is one of the Channel Islands and part of the Bailiwick of Guernsey
 St Helier Road             - St Helier is the largest town in Jersey and its capital
 Gorey Road                 - Gorey is a village in Jersey
 Corbiere Avenue            - La Corbière is a lighthouse and the south-westernmost point in Jersey
 St Brelades Avenue         - St Brélade is a parish in Jersey
 Firman Road                - Fermain valley, a valley in Guernsey
 Plemont Close              - Plémont, St Ouen, a beach in Jersey
 Portelet Close             - Portelet, St Brélade, a beach in Jersey

References

External links

Areas of Poole